Sven Magnus Aurivillius was a Swedish zoologist born  12 August 1892 in Stockholm and died 4 March 1928 in .

He was the director of the centre for marine zoology in Kristineberg in 1923 but left prematurely, just before the publishing of his thesis on Japanese sea fans. He was the eighth generation of his family to be a doctor at the University of Uppsala. His father was the entomologist Per Olof Christopher Aurivillius (1853–1928), and his uncle was the zoologist Carl Wilhelm Samuel Aurivillius (1854–1899).

References 
 Short biography at BEMON

1892 births
1928 deaths
Scientists from Stockholm
20th-century Swedish zoologists